Dietrich Friedrich Eduard Kasimir von Saucken (16 May 1892 – 27 September 1980) was a German general during World War II who commanded the 2nd Army and the Army East Prussia. Turning down an offer to escape by air, he surrendered to the Red Army in May 1945. Saucken was the last officer to be awarded the Knight's Cross of the Iron Cross with Oak Leaves, Swords and Diamonds of Nazi Germany.

Early life and career

Saucken was born on 16 May 1892 in Fischhausen, East Prussia. He was the son of Landrat (the chief administrative officer of a Landkreis) Wilhelm Eduard Erich von Saucken. As a child, Saucken attended the Collegium Fridericianum, a prestigious gymnasium in Königsberg, present-day Kaliningrad, where he graduated with his Abitur (university-preparatory high school diploma) in 1910. As a student, Saucken showed aptitude as an artist, a talent supported by his mother and the director of the Fridericianum, Georg Ellendt. He often visited Nidden, present-day Nida, Lithuania, where his ambitions to become an artist were influenced by the Künstlerkolonie Nidden, an expressionist artists' colony.

Division (1st Division) and based in Königsberg. There, he was promoted to Leutnant (second lieutenant) on 19 June 1912.

World War I and interwar period
With the outbreak of World War I, the division was deployed on the Eastern Front. With the  division, Saucken fought in the battles of Stallupönen, Gumbinnen, and Tannenberg and earned the Iron Cross 2nd Class in October 1914.

Saucken then fought in the Battle of Verdun and in the battles of the Carpathian Mountains in September 1917, and received the Iron Cross 1st Class in May 1916. For combat in the German spring offensive and Hundred Days Offensive on the Western Front, he received the Prussian Knight's Cross of the Royal House Order of Hohenzollern with Swords and the Austrian Military Merit Cross. In 1918, he also served with the Baltic Sea Division under the command of General Rüdiger von der Goltz which fought in the Finnish Civil War (27 January – 15 May 1918).

After the First World War he joined the paramilitary Freikorps. In 1921 he joined the Reichswehr. From 1927 on he was on special assignment in the Soviet Union, where he learned to speak Russian. In 1934 he was promoted to Major and posted as an instructor to the War School Hannover. He was promoted to Oberst (colonel) on 1 June 1939.

World War II
Saucken took part in Battle of France, Balkan Campaign, Operation Barbarossa as commander of a motorised brigade of the 4th Panzer Division. He was promoted to Generalmajor on 1 January 1942 and appointed divisional commander during the Battle of Moscow. He was wounded and thereafter spent several months in the hospital. He was awarded the Knight's Cross of the Iron Cross on January 6, and was appointed commandant of the School for Mobile Troops (Schule für Schnelle Truppen). On 1 April 1943 he was promoted to Generalleutnant; in June he returned to the 4th Panzer Division, which he commanded during the Battle of Kursk.

Saucken became acting commander of the III Panzer Corps in late June 1944. He received both the Knight's Cross of the Iron Cross with Oak Leaves and the Knight's Cross of the Iron Cross with Oak Leaves and Swords in 1944.

In June and July, Saucken formed Kampfgruppe von Saucken (Battlegroup von Saucken) an ad hoc unit composed of the remnants of several units that had been destroyed in the Soviet Operation Bagration against the Army Group Centre. Composed mainly of elements of the 5th Panzer Division, 170th Infantry Division and the 505th Heavy Panzer Battalion, the battlegroup was later designated the XXXIX Panzer Corps. During the Soviet Minsk Offensive, it temporarily maintained an escape route across the Berezina River for retreating German soldiers.

Saucken left the XXXIX Panzer Corps in late September 1944, when he took command of the forming Panzerkorps Großdeutschland. The still incomplete corps was divided when half of it, including Saucken, was ordered eastward to stop the Vistula–Oder Offensive. He led the corps until February 1945, when he was removed from his position and placed in the Führerreserve by Heinz Guderian, the Chief of Staff of the Army at the OKH.

A month later, Saucken commanded the 2nd Army in Prussia and provided logistical support to the Evacuation of East Prussia. In April, his army was renamed to Army East Prussia. On 8 May, Saucken received notice that he had been awarded the Knight's Cross with Oak leaves, Swords, and Diamonds, making him the last of 27 officers to receive this award. Though an airplane stood by to evacuate him, he refused to leave his troops when they surrendered to the Red Army on the following day of 9 May 1945.

Later life

After surrendering on the Hel Peninsula, Saucken went into Soviet captivity. Initially he was imprisoned in the Lubyanka Building and the Oryol Prison before being transferred to the Siberian Tayshet camp in 1949. Kept in solitary confinement, ordered to do hard labour and tortured by Soviet interrogators after refusing to sign false confessions, Saucken had to use a wheelchair for the rest of his life. Released from Soviet captivity in 1955, he settled in Pullach near Munich. He died there in 1980.

Character traits
A cavalry officer who regularly wore both a sword and a monocle, Saucken personified the archetypal aristocratic Prussian conservative who despised the braune Bande ("brown mob") of Nazis. When he was ordered to take command of the Second Army on 12 March 1945, he came to Hitler's headquarters with his left hand resting casually on his cavalry sabre, his monocle in his eye, . . . [and then] gave a military salute and gave a slight bow. These were three 'outrages' at once. He had not given the Nazi salute with raised arm and the words 'Heil Hitler', as had been regulation since 20 July 1944, he had not surrendered his weapon on entering....and had kept his monocle in his eye when saluting Hitler.

When Hitler told him that he must take his orders from Albert Forster, the Gauleiter (Nazi governor, or "District Leader") of Danzig, Saucken returned Hitler's gaze....and striking the marble slab of the map table with the flat of his hand, he said, 'I have no intention, Herr Hitler, of placing myself under the orders of a Gauleiter'. In doing this he had bluntly contradicted Hitler and not addressed him as Mein Führer.

To the surprise of everyone who was present, Hitler capitulated and replied, "All right, Saucken, keep the command yourself." Hitler dismissed the General without shaking his hand and Saucken left the room with only the merest hint of a bow.

Awards
 Iron Cross (1914) 2nd Class (19 October 1914) & 1st Class (23 May 1916)
 Clasp to the Iron Cross (1939) 2nd Class (13 September 1939) & 1st Class (3 October 1939)
 Knight's Cross of the Iron Cross with Oak Leaves, Swords, and Diamonds
 Knight's Cross on 6 January 1942 as Generalmajor and leader of the 4. Panzer-Division
 281st Oak Leaves on 22 August 1943 as Generalleutnant and commander of the 4. Panzer-Division
 46th Swords on 31 January 1944 as Generalleutnant and commander of the 4. Panzer-Division
 27th Diamonds on 8 May 1945 as General der Panzertruppe and commander in chief of AOK Ostpreußen

Promotions

Notes

References

Citations

Bibliography

 
 Samuel W. Mitcham (2001). Crumbling Empire, the German Defeat in the East, 1944. Westport, Praeger. .

External links
 

1892 births
1980 deaths
People from Primorsk, Kaliningrad Oblast
People from East Prussia
Generals of Panzer Troops
Recipients of the Knight's Cross of the Iron Cross with Oak Leaves, Swords and Diamonds
Recipients of the clasp to the Iron Cross, 1st class
Recipients of the Military Merit Cross (Bavaria)
German Army personnel of World War I
German prisoners of war in World War II held by the Soviet Union
Prussian Army personnel
Reichswehr personnel
Burials at Munich Waldfriedhof